Schaden is a surname. Notable people with the surname include:

Chuck Schaden (born 1934), American radio personality and historian
Heinz Schaden (born 1954), Austrian politician
Otto Schaden (1937–2015), American Egyptologist